Gorky 2: My Apprenticeship is a 1939 Soviet drama film directed by Mark Donskoy.

Plot 
Alyosha Peshkov goes to work with his uncle, a draftsman, then a dishwasher, after which he goes to learn icon painting. He is kind and honest in nature; he cannot accept the surrounding injustice and he is without housing.

Starring 
 Aleksei Lyarsky as Aleksei Peshkov (later, Maxim Gorky)
 Irina Zarubina as Natalya, the washer-woman
 Varvara Massalitinova as Akulina Ivanovna Kashirina
 Ye. Lilina as Matriona Ivanovna
 Ivan Kudryavtsev as Sergeyev, the son-in-law (as I. Kudryavtsev)
 Nadezhda Berezovskaya as Ivanovna-Sergeyeva, daughter (as N. Berezovskaya)
 Ye. Seleznyov as Viktor Ivanov, son
 Darya Zerkalova as The Rich Woman With Books (segment "like Queen Margo") (as D. Zerkalova)
 Aleksandr Timontayev as Smury, the cook (as A. Timontayev)
 Mikhail Povolotsky as Sergei, the ship's waiter

References

External links 

1939 films
1930s Russian-language films
Soviet black-and-white films
Soviet drama films
1939 drama films
Films set in Nizhny Novgorod